The Uppland Runic Inscription 258  is a Viking Age runestone engraved in Old Norse with the Younger Futhark runic alphabet. It is in granite and located at Fresta Church in Upplands Väsby Municipality.

Inscription
Transliteration of the runes into Latin characters

 kunar × uk × sasur × þiʀ × litu × risa × stin × þina × iftiʀ × kiʀbi(a)rn × faþur × sin × sun × ui(t)kars × i × (s)u--unisi × on × trabu × nurminr × o kniri × asbiarnaʀ
Old Norse transcription:

 

English translation:

 "Gunnarr and Sassurr, they had this stone raised in memory of Geirbjôrn, their father, Vittkarl/Hvítkarr of Svalunes's son. Norwegians killed him on Ásbjôrn's cargo-ship. "

References

Runestones in Uppland